Nelson Barrere (April 1, 1808 – August 20, 1883) was a U.S. Representative from Ohio, uncle of Granville Barrere.

Born in New Market, near Hillsboro, Ohio, Barrere attended the common schools, and Hillsboro High School in 1827.
He was graduated from Augusta (Kentucky) College in 1830.
He studied law.
He was admitted to the bar in 1833 and commenced practice in Hillsboro.
He moved to West Union, Ohio, in 1834 and continued the practice of law.
In 1846 returned to Hillsboro, where he resided until his death.
He served as member of the State house of representatives in 1837 and 1838.

Barrere was elected as a Whig to the Thirty-second Congress (March 4, 1851 – March 3, 1853).
He was an unsuccessful candidate for reelection in 1852 to the Thirty-third Congress.
He resumed the practice of law.
He died in Hillsboro, Ohio, August 20, 1883.
He was interred in Presbyterian Cemetery, New Market, Ohio.

Sources

1808 births
1883 deaths
People from Highland County, Ohio
Members of the Ohio House of Representatives
People from West Union, Ohio
Ohio lawyers
Whig Party members of the United States House of Representatives from Ohio
19th-century American politicians
19th-century American lawyers